was a city located in  Iwate Prefecture, Japan. It is currently part of the city of Ōshū.

Esashi village was created within Esashi District on April 1, 1899 with the establishment of the municipalities system. On February 10, 1955, it annexed the neighboring town of Iwayado and the villages of Inase, Atago, Tahara, Hirose, Sunagawa, Tamasato, Fujisato, Yonesato and Ide to form Esashi town. Esashi was raised to city status on November 3, 1958.

On February 20, 2006, Esashi, along with the city of Mizusawa, the towns of Isawa and Maesawa, and the village of Koromogawa (all from Isawa District), was merged to create the city of Ōshū, and no longer exists as an independent municipality.

As of February 2006, the city had an estimated population of 32,457 and a population density of 89.54 persons per km. The total area was 362.50 km.

Local attractions
Esashi contains a number of artifacts pertaining to the Northern Fujiwara clan, which dominated the Tohoku region in the Heian period. The Esashi Fujiwara no Sato is a theme park featuring buildings such as fortifications, palace structures, and government offices, which have been recreated to the past design.
Kurofune Square is a collection of black-and-white buildings. In style, these structures resemble storerooms. This feature of the design was chosen to impart uniformity to the stores housed in these buildings and to create a streetscape that would be unique to Esashi.
Esashi Kinsatsumai is one of the most sought-after rice varieties in Japan.

Former international relations
 - City of Greater Shepparton (Victoria, Australia) - sister city since March 3, 1979
 - Reutte/Breitenwang (Tyrol, Austria) - sister city since June 7, 1991

Climate

References

External links
 Ōshū official website 

Dissolved municipalities of Iwate Prefecture
Ōshū, Iwate